The 30th Filmfare Awards South ceremony honoring the winners of the best of South Indian cinema in 1982 was an event held in 1983.

Awards

Kannada cinema

Malayalam cinema

Tamil cinema

Telugu cinema

References

 Filmfare Magazine 1983.

General

External links
 
 

Filmfare Awards South